Mazzone is a surname. Notable people with the surname include:

 A. David Mazzone (1928–2004), US lawyer
 Adolfo Mazzone (1914–2001), Argentine comics artist
 Carlo Mazzone (born 1937), Italian football manager
 Dora Mazzone (born 1967), Venezuelan actress
 Jason Mazzone (born 1970), American law school professor
 Juan Rosario Mazzone, Argentine politician
 Leo Mazzone (born 1948), American baseball pitcher
 Luca Mazzone (born 1971), Italian swimmer and cyclist
 Mario Mazzone (1958–2007), Argentine journalist
 Natasha Mazzone (born 1979), South African politician
 Noel Mazzone (born 1957), American football coach and player
 Steven Mazzone (born 1964), American mobster

Italian-language surnames